Fletcher Moss Rangers Football Club is an amateur junior football club based in Didsbury, Manchester, England, established in 1986. Former players Wes Brown, Jesse Lingard, Marcus Rashford, and Tyler Blackett have gone on to sign professional contracts with Manchester United and represent England, while Ravel Morrison went on to play for Jamaica and Keiren Westwood for Ireland.

Girls and boys at the club come from extremely deprived homes, with 75-80% of the players' families using free school meal vouchers.

The club is an FA Charter Standard Community Club.

The Club has a board of Trustees that help to organise and maintain the day to day elements of the club. Led by Chairman Daniel Francis the group is made up of:

 David Horrocks
 Amir Khan
 Scott Flitcroft
 Farhaan Ahmed
 Jessica Southworth

History

Fletcher Moss Rangers was established in 1986 by two fathers, Nigel Hanson and Howard Isaacs with his brother Barry. The club began by playing on Fletcher Moss Playing Fields, but have subsequently moved to their present location at Mersey Bank Playing Fields. In 2005 they were said to have had around 800 members of all ages and sexes.

Teams
The club has various playing squads both for boys and girls. In the season 2022/23, the squads were as follows:

Under 9s Elite Lions
Under 10s Hurricanes & Tornado’s
Under 11s Blues, Rebels, Barca, Yellows & Rosseland
Under 12s Yellows
Under 13s Blues, Apollo, Raiders & Girls
Under 14s Yellows & Colts
Under 15s Blues & Yellows

FA Charter Standard

The club is an FA Charter Standard Community Club,. To obtain this award the club had to be affiliated to a County FA, have at least one team in a League sanctioned by The FA, have a bank account in the club's name and provide a financial statement approved by the club's committee. In addition the club had to have a disciplinary record within The FA Respect discipline threshold, operate within a set of club rules, have a club equality policy and have adopted the FA Respect Code of Conduct.

For the FA Charter Standard Community Club, the club also had to have club officials who are proud to make their environment safe, fun and inclusive for all, provide recent committee meeting minutes, have a club Safeguarding Policy, have FA Enhanced DBS (Disclosure and Barring Service) check for all club officials, have a first aider for each adult team with an in date FA Level 1 introduction to first aid in football, at least one FA Level 1 qualified coach per team with in
date first aid and Safeguarding Children certificate, have a coach:player ratio of 1:16 or less and to provide links to attract new players and opportunities
to move, transition or progress players.

Former players

David Horrocks, Trustee of the club, said in 2016 that he believed that 73 youngsters had signed for professional clubs, either at home or abroad. In 2020 alone, six players (Cole Umebuani, Teddy Sherwood, Jaice Dore, Rafael Smith, Dane Mullings and Ka’eo Ingram) from Fletcher Moss Rangers signed for Manchester United and one (Tolani Raheem) for Manchester City.

Below is an incomplete list of professional players to have played for Fletcher Moss Rangers:

Tosin Adarabioyo    
Kyle Bartley
Tyler Blackett
Cameron Borthwick-Jackson
Reece Brown
Wes Brown
Lewis Chalmers
Andy Crompton
Zeki Fryers
Shaun Hobson
Jordy Hiwula
Jesse Lingard
Emma McDougall
Demetri Mitchell  
Ravel Morrison
Warren Peyton
Marcus Rashford
Devonte Redmond
Ashley Smith-Brown
Cameron Stewart
Danny Webber
Danny Welbeck
Keiren Westwood 
Ro-Shaun Williams

See also
List of Fletcher Moss Rangers players

References

External links 
 
 

Youth football clubs in England
Association football clubs established in 1986
Football clubs in Manchester
Didsbury